Živorad Mišić (Serbian Cyrillic: Живорад Мишић; born 1 October 1986) is a Serbian football forward.

References

External links
 Profile at fkslogapetrovac.com
 
 Stats at prvaligasrbije.com

1986 births
Living people
Sportspeople from Požarevac
Association football forwards
Serbian footballers
FK Javor Ivanjica players
FK Sloga Petrovac na Mlavi players
Serbian SuperLiga players